During the debates over the design and ratification of the United States Constitution, in 1787 and 1788, a large number of writers in the popular press used pseudonyms. This list shows some of the more important commentaries and the (known or presumed) authors responsible for them.  Note: the identity of the person behind several of these pseudonyms is not known for certain.

Literature 
 The Documentary History of the Ratification of the Constitution, Vols. XIII-XVI. Ed. John P. Kaminski and Gaspare J. Saladino. Madison: State Historical Society of Wisconsin, 1981.

References 

Ratification of the United States Constitution
United States history-related lists